Achanum Makanum is a 1957 Indian Malayalam-language film, directed by Vimal Kumar. The film stars Prem Nazir and Kumari Thankam. The film had musical score by V. Dakshinamoorthy. It is the first movie of actor Jagathy Sreekumar.

Cast
 Sathyan as Reghu
 Bahadoor as Arjunan
 K. V. Shanthi as Shrikala
 Kumari Thankam as Sarasu
 S. P. Pillai as Forest Officer
 T. S. Muthaiah as Premchand
 G. K. Pillai as Constable Velu Pilla
 Jagathy Sreekumar as Vikraman (Child Artist)
 Gopi as Neelan Kandan
 B. S. Saroja as Kamalam
 Kunjikkuttan as Muthalali
 Thikkurissy Sukumaran Nair as Shankaracharu
 Abraham Joseph as Vikraman
 Kuttan Pillai as Adv. Mohan Kumar
 Muthukulam Raghavan Pillai as Adv. Manoharam Pilla
 Anayara M. P. as Uttharavu Kaimal
 Kalaikkal Kumaran as Raman

Soundtrack
The film's soundtrack contains 11 songs, all composed by Vimal Kumar and Lyrics by Thirunalloor Karunakaran, Thirunainar Kurichi Madhavan Nair, and P. Bhaskaran.

References

External links
 

1957 films
1950s Malayalam-language films
Films directed by Vimal Kumar